Eagle Gorge is a valley in the U.S. state of Washington.

Eagle Gorge was named for the fact eagles nest in the area.

References

Landforms of King County, Washington
Valleys of Washington (state)